Twelfth planet may refer to:
 The 12th Planet, a pseudoscience book by Zecharia Sitchin
 12th Planet (musician), an American dubstep producer and DJ

See also
 IAU definition of planet